Lady Kinnaird was a three masted barque which was built in 1877 at Dundee, Scotland by Brown & Simpson for W.B. Ritchie. She operated between the United Kingdom and the Australian colonies.  She was lost after running aground in Spencer Gulf south of Cape Burr on the east coast of Eyre Peninsula in South Australia early on 21 January 1880.  Her main anchor was recovered from her wreck site in 1979 and was placed on display in the nearby town of Port Neill in January 1880 as part of the commemoration of the centenary of her loss.

Origins
Lady Kinnaird was built at Dundee in 1877 by Brown & Simpson for W.B. Ritchie.  She was of iron construction and had three masts.  She was reported as having at least one sister ship - Lord Kinnaird.

Career
Lady Kinnaird had a career sailing between ports in the United Kingdom and ports in the Australian colonies which was shortened by her loss after running aground on 21 January 1880.  On all of her voyages, the master was Alexander Laws.

The wrecking event 
Lady Kinnaird, under the command of Laws, left Port Pirie at 4.00 am on 19 January 1880 bound for the United Kingdom with a cargo about 8400 bags of wheat, being shipped on behalf of John Darling & Son. During the afternoon of 20 January, the wind direction changed to the south along with an increase in speed. At 8.00 pm, the wind conditions were described as ‘furious squalls’. The barque continued its course into the southerly wind. At about midnight, when about to do a planned change of course to the east or the southeast, it was discovered that the barque was close to the west coast of Spencer Gulf. As the barque did not respond to a change of course, the main anchor was released but its cable failed and before a second anchor could be released, the barque ran aground. The crew exited the wrecked vessel without loss of life and made way in lifeboats to the nearby shore where a camp was set up.

Aftermath
The Marine Board of South Australia held an inquiry in the loss of the barque and on 9 February 1880, found the master, Alexander Laws, to be negligent. A further inquiry presided over by four magistrates was convened where evidence from expert witnesses was heard.  On 25 February 1880, the inquiry found Captain Laws not guilty of the charge of negligence.

In 1911, the submerged rock (known as Lady Kinnaird Rock in some sources) which the Lady Kinnaird ran aground on was discovered and marked with a buoy. The buoy subsequently ‘disappeared’ in 1922 and was not replaced.

Recovery of the main anchor
In 1978, recreational divers living in Port Neil contacted the Society for Underwater Historical Research (SUHR) for advice about and for possible assistance with the raising of the main anchor from the wreck site and conserving it for public display as part of the commemorations planned for the centenary of the loss of the barque in 1980. In November 1978, the SUHR and local divers surveyed the wreck and located the anchor in  depth of water.  In March 1979, the SUHR and local divers lifted the main anchor from the wreck site and moved it to shallower water within  of the beach at Port Neill. In June 1979, the anchor towed ashore and lifted by mobile crane into a tank made of concrete built into the ground specifically for the purpose of conserving the anchor. On 20 January 1980, the conserved anchor was unveiled on a public reserve on the foreshore at Port Neil in front of a crowd estimated as being more than 800 people.

The present day
The wreck site was declared a historic shipwreck under the Historic Shipwrecks Act 1981 (SA) during April 1983. Since 1998, the main anchor has been on the register of local heritage places maintained by the District Council of Tumby Bay on the basis that it is ‘a notable landmark in the area.’

See also
List of shipwrecks of Australia
List of shipwrecks in 1880

Citations and references

Citations

References

External links
Wreck of the Lady Kinnaird

Ships built in Dundee
1877 ships
Individual sailing vessels
Maritime incidents in January 1880
Shipwrecks of South Australia
Spencer Gulf